The R618 road is a regional road in Ireland which runs west-east from the N22 bypass in Carrigaphooca, west of Macroom along the northern banks of the River Lee to rejoin the N22 at Carrigrohane near Cork City.  The road passes through Carrigadrohid, Coachford and Dripsey en route. The point where the R618 leaves the N22 on the outskirts of Cork is known as Kerry Pike. The road was once part of the main route between Cork and Kerry.

See also
Roads in Ireland
National primary road
National secondary road

References
Roads Act 1993 (Classification of Regional Roads) Order 2006 – Department of Transport

Regional roads in the Republic of Ireland
Roads in County Cork